Luciellidae is an extinct family of fossil sea snails, marine gastropod mollusks in the clade Vetigastropoda (according to the taxonomy of the Gastropoda by Bouchet & Rocroi, 2005). This family has no subfamilies.

Genera 
Genera within the family Luciellidae include: 
 Luciella, the type genus and
 Echinocirrus
 Epiptychia
 Platyconus
 Playfordia
 Prosolarium
 Zhuslennngospira

References

External links 
 PaleoBiology Database info, February 16, 2010